Araneus mitificus, commonly known as the kidney garden spider or pale orb weaver is a species of  orb-weaver spider found in South, East, and Southeast Asia.

Taxonomy
Araneus mitificus belongs to the genus Araneus. It is classified under the subfamily Araneinae of the orb-weaver spider family Araneidae. They are members of the superfamily of eight-eyed spiders Araneoidea of the suborder Araneomorphae.  The species was originally described in 1886 as Epeira mitifica by the French arachnologist Eugène Simon.

Description

Araneus mitificus are small spiders and exhibit sexual dimorphism. Males are smaller, reaching only , and are generally less colorful than the females.

Their abdomens are globular and covered with fine hair. They slope abruptly from the mid-region to the posterior. Two small but distinct tubercles are present at the rear end. The dorsal surface is covered with white and black patterns that can vary considerably. The front edge usually has a wide black band. In the upper center is a characteristic large kidney-shaped marking (which can sometimes be a faint vertical line or V-shaped), from which it derives its common name. Immediately below it are two small but prominent black pits (fovea). At the posterior half is a series of faint transverse ridges. The markings on the back of the spider can resemble a human face if viewed from the front.

The ventral side of the abdomen is a uniform green. The epigynes of the females have unwrinkled, very short and thick scapes.

The cephalothorax is reddish, yellowish, or green in color. It is narrower at the front than at the back and also covered with fine pubescence. The sternum is heart-shaped, narrowing towards the back. It is covered with long, black, spine-like hairs. They have eight eyes arranged in two recurved rows. The front row of eyes are larger and more recurved than the back row. Dark rings encircle the pair of central back eyes and the lateral eyes are close together and mounted on black tubercles.

The labium is wider than it is long and yellowish. The maxillae have almost square shapes and have distinct tufts of hair at the tips (scopulae). The chelicerae and pedipalps are also yellowish to brownish in color.

The legs are moderately strong and long. They are reddish, yellowish, pale green, to brownish in color. The distal ends of the leg segments have transverse bands dark brown in color. They are covered with long black spines and fine hairs. Its leg formula is 1-2-4-3, with the first pair the longest, and the third pair the shortest.

Distribution and habitat

Araneus mitificus are found in South, East, and Southeast Asia; west from Pakistan and India, north towards China and Japan, and south towards the Philippines, Papua New Guinea and Australia.

They are common in gardens and low vegetation. They often build their webs among bushes.

Behavior
Araneus mitificus builds orb webs that are characteristically missing a section. The spider does not rest on the center of the web, but instead builds a silk-lined sanctuary in a leaf at the margins. The leaf is bent at the edges and roofed with a mesh of silk. If a prey animal becomes entangled in the web, the vibrations from its struggle travel to the center of the web, then along a single long strand of silk (the signal line) positioned in the empty section. The strand is linked to the hidden spider. Once the spider feels the signal line vibrate, it will rush out to capture the prey.

Males also build orb webs, often near the webs of females. Their webs are usually smaller.

See also

Zygiella x-notata
Araneus quadratus
Araneus diadematus
List of Araneidae speciesOrb-weaver spider

References

Further reading
Simon, E. 1886. Arachnides recuellis par M. A. Pavie (sous chef du service des postes au Cambodge) dans le royaume de Siam, au Cambodge et en Cochinchine. Actes de la Société Linnéenne de Bordeaux 40: 150.
Platnick, N. I. 2008. The World Spider Catalog, version 9.0.'' American Museum of Natural History.

External links
 Video of an Araneus mitificus showing the pulsing of its heartbeat along the cardiac marks.
 Detailed drawings of body parts from the Encyclopedia of Life China.

Araneus
Spiders of Asia
Spiders described in 1886